National institution Museum Kumanovo (Macedonian Cyrillic: Национална установа Музеј Куманово) is a museum in Kumanovo, North Macedonia. In 2014, the museum celebrated its 50th anniversary.

Governance
The museum is owned and operated by the Ministry of Culture of Macedonia.

Building

Departments

Gallery

See also
 Cultural Center Trajko Prokopiev
 Contemporary Art Museum of Macedonia
 Holocaust Memorial Center for the Jews of Macedonia
 Memorial House of Mother Teresa
 Museum of Macedonia
 Museum of the City of Skopje
 Museum of the Macedonian Struggle (Skopje)
 National Gallery of Macedonia

References

External links
  Official Facebook Page

Buildings and structures in Kumanovo
Museums in North Macedonia
Museums established in 1964